River Derwent or Derwent River may refer to:

Rivers in England
River Derwent, Derbyshire
River Derwent, North East England, on the border between County Durham and Northumberland
River Derwent, Cumbria in the Lake District
River Derwent, Yorkshire

Rivers in Australia
 River Derwent (Tasmania)
 Derwent Creek, a tributary of the Warburton River in South Australia

Ships
, a number of ships with this name

See
 Derwent (disambiguation)